Tropical savanna climate or tropical wet and dry climate is a tropical climate sub-type that corresponds to the Köppen climate classification categories Aw (for a dry "winter") and As (for a dry "summer").

In essence, a tropical savanna climate tends to either see less overall rainfall than a tropical monsoon climate or have more pronounced dry season(s).

In tropical savanna climates, the dry season can become severe, and often drought conditions prevail during the course of the year. Tropical savanna climates often feature tree-studded grasslands due to its dryness, rather than thick jungle. It is this widespread occurrence of tall, coarse grass (called savanna) which has led to Aw and As climates often being referred to as the tropical savanna. However, there is some doubt whether tropical grasslands are climatically induced. Additionally, pure savannas, without trees, are the exception rather than the rule.

Versions
There are generally four types of tropical savanna climates:

 Distinct wet and dry seasons of relatively equal duration. Most of the region's annual rainfall is experienced during the wet season and very little precipitation falls during the dry season.
 A lengthy dry season and a relatively short wet season. This version features seven or more dry season months and five or fewer wet season months. There are more variations within this version:
On one extreme, the region receives just enough precipitation during the short wet season to preclude it from a semi-arid climate classification. This drier variation of the tropical savanna climate is typically found adjacent to regions with hot semi-arid (BSh) climates.
On the other extreme, the climate features a lengthy dry season followed by a short but extremely rainy wet season. However, regions with this variation of the climate do not experience enough rainfall during the wet season to qualify as a tropical monsoon climate. These can be found near tropical monsoon climates.
 A lengthy wet season and a relatively short dry season. This version features seven or more wet season months and five or fewer dry season months. This version's precipitation pattern is similar to precipitation patterns observed in some tropical monsoon climates but does not experience enough rainfall during the wet season to be classified as such.
 A dry season with a noticeable amount of rainfall followed by a rainy wet season. In essence, this version mimics the precipitation patterns more commonly found in a tropical monsoon climate, but do not receive enough precipitation during either the dry season or the year to be classified as such.

Distribution 

Tropical savanna climates are most commonly found in Africa, Asia and South America. The climate is also prevalent in sections of Central America, northern Australia, the Pacific Islands, in sections of North America and some islands in the Caribbean. Most places that have this climate are found at the outer margins of the tropical zone, but occasionally an inner-tropical location (e.g., San Marcos, Antioquia, Colombia) also qualifies. Similarly, the Caribbean coast, eastward from the Gulf of Urabá on the Colombia – Panamá border to the Orinoco scriver delta, on the Atlantic Ocean (ca. ), have long dry periods (the extreme is the BSh climate (see below), characterized by very low, unreliable precipitation, present, for instance, in extensive areas in the Guajira, and Coro, western Venezuela, the northernmost peninsulas in South America, which receive < total annual precipitation, practically all in two or three months). This condition extends to the Lesser Antilles and Greater Antilles forming the Circumcaribbean dry belt. The length and severity of the dry season diminishes inland (southward); at the latitude of the Amazon river—which flows eastward, just south of the equatorial line—the climate is Af. East from the Andes, between the arid Caribbean and the ever-wet Amazon, are the Orinoco river Llanos or savannas, from where this climate takes its name.

Sometimes As is used in place of Aw if the dry season occurs during the time of higher sun and longer days. This may also be due to a rain shadow effect that cuts off summer precipitation in a tropical area. This is the case in East Africa (Mombasa, Kenya, Somalia), Sri Lanka (Trincomalee) and coastal regions of Northeastern Brazil (from São Luís through Natal to Maceió), for instance. The difference between "summer" and "winter" in such tropical locations is usually so slight that a distinction between an As and Aw climate is a quibble. In most places that have tropical wet and dry climates, however, the dry season occurs during the time of lower sun and shorter days because of reduction of or lack of convection, which in turn is due to the meridional shifts of the Intertropical Convergence Zone during the entire course of the year, based on which hemisphere the location sits.

Cities with a tropical savanna climate 
<div float="left">

 Abidjan, Ivory Coast
 Accra, Ghana
 Bangkok, Thailand
 Banjul, The Gambia
 Barranquilla, Colombia
 Brasília, Brazil
 Cali, Colombia
 Cancun, Mexico
 Cartagena de Indias, Colombia
 Chennai, Tamil Nadu, India
 Dar es Salaam, Tanzania
 Darwin, Northern Territory, Australia
 Denpasar, Indonesia
 Dili, East Timor
 Dhaka, Bangladesh
 Guayaquil, Ecuador
 Havana, Cuba
 Ho Chi Minh City, Vietnam
 Jaffna, Sri Lanka
 Kano, Nigeria
 Key West, Florida, United States
 Kingston, Jamaica
 Khulna, Bangladesh

 Kigali, Rwanda
 Kolkata, West Bengal, India 
 Kupang, West Timor, Indonesia
 Lagos, Nigeria
 Mandalay, Myanmar
 Maputo, Mozambique
 Mombasa, Kenya
 Mumbai, Maharashtra, India
 Nha Trang, Vietnam
 Phnom Penh, Cambodia
 Port-au-Prince, Haiti
 Port Moresby, Papua New Guinea
 Port of Spain, Trinidad and Tobago
 Rio de Janeiro, Brazil
 San Salvador, El Salvador
 Santiago de los Caballeros, Dominican Republic
 Sanya, Hainan, China
 Surabaya, Indonesia
 Tangail, Bangladesh
 Tegucigalpa, Honduras
 Townsville, Queensland, Australia
 Trincomalee, Sri Lanka
 Vientiane, Laos

Some examples of tropical savanna climates

See also 
 Tropics
 Köppen climate classification
 Tropical marine climate

References

Köppen climate types
Climate, Savanna